Naevius is a genus of South American tangled nest spiders first described by V. D. Roth in 1967.

Species
 it contains four species:
Naevius calilegua Compagnucci & Ramírez, 2000 — Argentina
Naevius manu Brescovit & Bonaldo, 1996 — Peru
Naevius varius (Keyserling, 1879) — Peru
Naevius zongo Brescovit & Bonaldo, 1996 — Bolivia

References

Amaurobiidae
Araneomorphae genera